Nicole Horner may refer to a principal character in:
 Les Diaboliques, a 1955 French film known as Diabolique in the United States
 Diabolique, a 1996 American film that is a remake of the above